Ploufolia is an extinct genus of plants in the order Nymphaeales. It existed in northeastern Spain during the Upper Albian period. One specimen of a species named Ploufolia cerciforme was discovered in 2010 at the Utrillas Formation, near Plou, Teruel Province; the genus name is derived from the locality of Plou.

References

Nymphaeales
Early Cretaceous plants
Fossil taxa described in 2010
Prehistoric angiosperm genera